Karvansara-ye Olya (also Romanized as Karvansarā-ye ‘Olyā; also known as Karvansarā) is a village in Beyranvand-e Shomali Rural District, Bayravand District, Khorramabad County, Lorestan Province, Iran. At the 2006 census, its population was 10, in 4 families.

References 

Towns and villages in Khorramabad County